Wang Quanshu (born March 1945) is a retired Chinese politician from Henan province. He served during his political career as the mayor of Pingdingshan, the secretary-general of the Henan party committee, the deputy party chief of Henan, and the Chairman of the Chinese People's Political Consultative Conference Henan Committee. He retired in 2011.

Biography
Wang Quanshu was born in Changyuan County, Henan in 1945. He has a degree in Chinese language from Henan University. He joined the People's Liberation Army in 1968, serving for some six years. In 1973 he joined the provincial party committee as a secretary, then took on a research position in the Henan Planning Commission. In 1988 he became deputy chair of the Henan Planning and Economics Commission. In 1991, he was named Mayor of Pingdingshan. In 1993, he became secretary-general of the provincial party committee, and a member of the provincial Party Standing Committee. In 2000, he became deputy party chief of Henan.

In 2006, Wang was named Chairman of the Chinese People's Political Consultative Conference Henan Committee. He left politics in 2011, aged 65.

External links
 Profile of Wang Quanshu, Xinhuanet.

1945 births
People's Republic of China politicians from Henan
Living people
Chinese Communist Party politicians from Henan
Politicians from Xinxiang
Mayors of places in China
Political office-holders in Henan